Darryl Fears is an American journalist, known for his work on race, climate, conservation, and environmental justice. He joined The Washington Post as a reporter in 1999 and was one of the recipients of the 2020 Pulitzer Prize for Explanatory Reporting for the 2°C: Beyond the Limit series, illustrating the impact of climate change using temperature data. Prior to joining the Post, he worked for the Los Angeles Times, the Detroit Free Press, and as the city hall bureau chief for The Atlanta-Journal Constitution. Fears was born in the Tampa Bay area and graduated from Howard University. He's a member of the National Association of Black Journalists and the Society of Environmental Journalists.

References 

Pulitzer Prize for Explanatory Journalism winners
African-American journalists
Howard University alumni
Living people
Year of birth missing (living people)
21st-century African-American people